New Lodge may refer to:

New Lodge, Winkfield near Windsor, Berkshire, England
New Lodge, South Yorkshire, England
New Lodge, Belfast, an area of North Belfast, Northern Ireland
New Lodge, Billericay, association football ground in Billericay, Essex, home of Billericay Town F.C.